Carl Gunnar Michael Fant (October 8, 1919 – June 6, 2009) was a leading researcher in speech science in general and speech synthesis in particular who spent most of his career as a professor at the Swedish Royal Institute of Technology (KTH) in Stockholm. He was a first cousin of the actors and directors George Fant and Kenne Fant.

Gunnar Fant received a Master of Science in Electrical Engineering from KTH in 1945. He specialized in the acoustics of the human voice, measuring formant values, and continued to work in this area at Ericsson and at the Massachusetts Institute of Technology. He also took the initiative of creating a speech communication department at KTH, unusual at the time.

Fant's work led to the birth of a new era of speech synthesis with the introduction of powerful and configurable formant synthesizers. In 1960 he published the source-filter model of speech production, which became widely used. In the 1960s, Gunnar Fant's Orator Verbis Electris (OVE) competed with Walter Lawrence's Parametric Artificial Talker (PAT) in creating lifelike speech synthesis.

In later years, Gunnar Fant remained active in the area of speech synthesis, focusing mainly on research on prosody.

Fant received honorary doctorates from the Grenoble University (1978) and from Stockholm University (1988), and several other awards. In 1989, he was the inaugural recipient Scientific Achievement Medal of the International Speech Communication Association.  He also received the Swedish Academy Margit Påhlson award, and the IEEE James L. Flanagan Speech and Audio Processing Award (2003). He was a member
of the Royal Swedish Academy of Sciences and the Royal Swedish Academy of Engineering Sciences.

Bibliography
 Gunnar Fant (1970) Acoustic Theory of Speech Production. Mouton De Gruyter. 
 Gunnar Fant (2006) Speech Acoustics and Phonetics: Selected Writings. Springer. 
 Roman Jakobson, C. Gunnar M. Fant, and Morris Halle (1961) Preliminaries to Speech Analysis: The Distinctive Features and Their Correlates. Cambridge, MA: The MIT Press.

References

Sources
 Dennis H. Klatt (1987). "Review of text-to-speech conversion for English". The Journal of the Acoustical Society of America, Vol. 82, No. 3, September 1987, pp. 737–793.

External links
Gunnar Fant's web page
Audio clips from Dennis Klatt's "Review of text-to-speech conversion for English"

1919 births
2009 deaths
Academic staff of the KTH Royal Institute of Technology
Swedish scientists
20th-century Swedish engineers
Speech perception researchers
Members of the Royal Swedish Academy of Sciences
Members of the Royal Swedish Academy of Engineering Sciences
Phoneticians